Albert J. Ruffo (July 1, 1908 – February 10, 2003) was an American politician, philanthropist, educator, lawyer, and football coach.

Ruffo grew up in Tacoma, Washington. In 1927 he moved to San Jose, California to attend nearby Santa Clara University, where he played football, and graduated with degrees in political science, electrical engineering, and literature. After graduating in 1931, Ruffo taught in the university's school of engineering and coached the freshman football team to help pay for attending law school. In 1936 he graduated at the head of his class from Santa Clara University School of Law. After passing the bar exam, he continued to coach football with the university as the assistant varsity coach under legendary SCU head coach Lawrence T. "Buck" Shaw and helped lead the team to victory in the 1937 and 1938 Sugar Bowls against LSU.

In San Francisco, Ruffo and a former college football teammate, Tony Morabito, became partners in a lumber delivery business. But Morabito soon began to focus on starting a pro football franchise and Ruffo was enlisted to set up the legal framework for what was to become Morabito's San Francisco 49ers, who began play in the All-America Football Conference (AAFC) in 1946. While waiting for the 49ers' (and the AAFC's) first season of operation Buck Shaw and Ruffo spent the 1945 season as Head Coach and Assistant for the University of California Golden Bears.

He was an assistant coach to Buck Shaw for the 49ers first two years of operation, which happened to be while he was serving as mayor of San Jose, California. He later became a part owner of the team and remained so for 24 years until it was sold to Eddie DeBartolo, Jr. in 1977.

He served eight years on the San Jose city council (1944–1952), and was the city's 48th mayor from 1946 to 1948. During his time on the council, A. P. Hamann, another of Ruffo's teammates at Santa Clara, was hired as city manager and the rapid growth of San Jose began. After leaving public office, Ruffo worked as an attorney, specializing in land development law; Ruffo represented land developers in many of the city's annexation and zoning hearings, lawsuits, and deals.

A 1979 San Jose State University study ranked Ruffo as one of the 10 most powerful people in San Jose. In 1997, he was inducted into the Santa Clara County Sports Hall of Fame.

Ruffo filed a lawsuit in 1998 against San Jose's new leaders to stop them from using redevelopment funds to build a new city hall. In 2001, he won a state appeals court ruling on the case.

External links
 Al Ruffo Was Present 50 Years Ago At 49Ers' Birth (Nov 24, 1996)
 Past and Present Leadership of The California State University
 Santa Clara University Alumni - Ignatian Award Honorees
 
 Feng City
 San Francisco Chronicle obituary (Feb 12, 2003)
 Little Italy San Jose - Al Ruffo Banner (Aug 31, 2011)

1908 births
2003 deaths
California lawyers
Mayors of San Jose, California
National Football League owners
San Francisco 49ers coaches
Santa Clara Broncos football players
Santa Clara University alumni
Santa Clara University School of Law alumni
20th-century American politicians
20th-century American lawyers
Players of American football from San Jose, California
San Francisco 49ers owners